Amannus vittiger is a species of beetle in the family Cerambycidae. It was described by John Lawrence LeConte in 1858.

References

Trachyderini
Beetles described in 1858